This chart includes the 10 best-selling songs of 2014. According to Official Charts, "Happy" by Pharrell Williams was the best selling song of 2014 with 6.45 million copies sold in the United States. "Happy" was also the Billboard number one song of 2014. This is the fifth time in the past seven years that singer Katy Perry has had a song in the year-end top 10 best selling songs. She's the only artist who is able to make that claim. "Happy" and Idina Menzel's "Let It Go" are both songs from animated movies. "Happy" is from Despicable Me 2, and "Let It Go" is from Frozen.

Songs written in bold are songs that were released before January 1, 2014.

This chart is only for the United States.

List of best-selling songs

Albums
According to Billboard, the best-selling album was 1989, by Taylor Swift. It sold 3.66 million copies in the US. It topped the Frozen Soundtrack album on the last week of December. Frozen's album sold 3.53 million copies. This is the second time Swift has earned the top selling album of a calendar year. She did it previously back in 2009 with her second studio album, Fearless, which made 3.22 million that year.

Albums written in bold were released before January 1, 2014.

This chart is only for the United States.

List of best-selling albums

See also

References

2014 in American music